Magnolia sirindhorniae is a plant species in the genus  Magnolia, family Magnoliaceae, described by Hans Peter Nooteboom and Piya Chalermglin.

It is a magnolia species endemic to swamp forest of central Thailand in Tha Luang District, Lopburi Province. It was named in honor of Princess Maha Chakri Sirindhorn.

References

sirindhorniae
Endemic flora of Thailand